Lecanophora may refer to:
 Lecanophora (beetle), a genus of beetles in the family Curculionidae
 Lecanophora (plant), a genus of plants in the family Malvaceae